John Sing Tang  (1913  – December 3, 1987) was a modernist architect from Arizona. He worked in the Phoenix metropolitan area, and designed many homes in the Arcadia area in the 1950s and 1960s. He was the first Chinese-American architect licensed in Arizona. He received his degree in architecture from Rice University in 1944. Though many of his commercial works have been demolished he is still highly regarded architect in Arizona. His Helsing's Coffee Shop and Melrose Bowling Alley designs of the late 1950s are considered exceptional examples of Googie Architecture (both now demolished). Tang died  in 1987 at Saint Joseph's Hospital in Phoenix at the age of 74.

Buildings 
Tang's works include
 1948 F. T. Weirmusz residence, Phoenix
  "Party House" at 3106 N 15th Ave. Phoenix
 1951 Better Made Potato Chips Plant, Phoenix (Demolished)
 1951 Rancho Del Monte Subdivision, Phoenix
 1950–1952 Sun View Estates Subdivision, Phoenix
 1952 residence at 5960 E. Orange Blossom Ln. Phoenix
 1952–1953 Nixson Square Subdivision, Phoenix
 1953 Rancho Grande Subdivision, Phoenix
  Wellton Grammar School, Wellton
 1953 Central and Person Shopping Center, Phoenix
 1953 Winterhaven Subdivision, Tucson
 1950s Pecan Grove Elementary School, Yuma
 1950s El Rancho Motel, Yuma
 1950s Silver Spur Motel, Yuma
 1954 Frontier Plaza Shopping Center, Scottsdale (Demolished)
 1955 Helsing's Coffee shop Central & Camelback, Phoenix (Demolished).
 1956 Subdivision at 34th Ave and Glendale Ave, Phoenix
 1957 Melrose Bowl, Phoenix (Demolished)
 1957 Central High School, Phoenix
 1957 Gila Vista Jr. High School, Yuma
 1957 Palmcroft Elementary School, Yuma AZ (Additions)
 1957 residence at 6740 E. Stallion Rd. Paradise Valley (Demolished)
 1957 Del Monte Estates Subdivision, Phoenix
 1956–1958 B. J. Leonard residence, Paradise Valley
 1958 Kerns Cafeteria 1730 E. McDowell Rd. Phoenix
 1958 Ding Ho Restraint, Phoenix (Demolished)
 1958 Pyle Estates Subdivision, Phoenix
 1959 Helsing's Coffee shop Central & Osborn, Phoenix (Demolished) both coffee shops were considered some of Phoenix's best examples of Googie architecture
 1961 Phi Kappa Alpha house, Arizona State University, Tempe (Demolished)
 1962 Conn & Candlin CPA Office, Phoenix
 1962 Glen Mar Apartments, Phoenix
 1963 Caribbean Apartments, Phoenix
 1964 Arizona Land Title Building, 2200 N. Central Ave. Phoenix
 1965 Flora M. Statler Homes, El Mirage
 1966 Associated Grocers Warehouse Expansion, Phoenix
 1970 State Commercial Building, 1601 W. Jefferson St. Phoenix
 1971 State Education Building, 1535 W. Jefferson St. Phoenix
 1974 Greenwood Memorial Park Crematory, Phoenix

References 

American architects of Chinese descent
Modernist architecture in Arizona
Architects from Arizona
1913 births
1987 deaths
Rice University alumni